The Women's field hockey Qualifying Tournaments for the 2008 Summer Olympics was a series of events in which teams compete for qualification for the 2008 Summer Olympics. Each team has a squad of up to 18 players with random jersey numbers.

Qualifying 1

Coach: Tahir Zaman

Emine Muzaffarova
Zarifahon Zeynalova
Feruza Makayeva
Lyudmila Chegurko
Dilfuza Mirzaliyeva (C)
Marina Aliyeva
Myungsoon Mammadova
Liana Nuriyeva
Seon Yeong Rustamova
Bo Kyung Alizada
Mi Kyung Alieva
Viktoriya Shahbazova (GK)
Yu Jin Avodonina (GK)
Zhang Suleymanova
Zhun Mammadova
Inoyathon Jafarova
Ji Eun Khudiyeva
Nazira Hidayatova

Coach: Nina Dashko

Yulia Lashuk (C)
Natallia Ambros
Hanna Kisel
Ryta Zhylianina
Volha Tarashcik
Mariya Halinovskaya
Yuliya Laptsevich
Alena Nekhai
Natallia Varabiova
Iryna Kazachok
Hanna Basarevskaya
Mariya Korzh-Tsepun
Alesia Vasilyeva
Sviatlana Bahushevich
Alesia Tratsiakova
Yuliya Mikheichyk
Alesia Piotukh
Nadzeya Vladzimirava (GK, C)

Coach: Alfredo Castro

Constanza Abud (GK)
Sofia Walbaum
Andrea Sanchez
Javiera Villagra
Paula Infante
Michelle Wilson (C)
Daniela Infante
Carolina Garcia
Fernanda Rodriguez
Maria Jose Fernandez
Beatriz Albertz
Claudia Schuller (GK)
Camila Caram
Carolina Varas
Daniela Caram
Camila Infante
Denise Infante
Sandra Wenz

Coach: Frederick Masibo

Josephina Ataro (GK)
Carole Okoth
Teresa Juma (C)
Michelle Morgan
Linet Onyango
Nerica Kuguru
Donner Ingumba
Rose Mbulo
Jane Ndirangu
Dorsilla Agunda
Jacqueline Otieno
Lillian Kimeu
Esther Mulli
Winnie Ngeno
Judith Owino
Flavian Amuhaya (GK)
Nomalizo Owuor
Lillian Aura

Coach: Pablo Usoz

María Jesús Rosa (GK)
Julia Menéndez
Rocio Ybarra
Paula Dabanch
Barbara Malda
Silvia Muñoz (C)
Silvia Bonastre
María Romagosa
Marta Ejarque
Raquel Huertas
Pilar Sánchez
Núria Camón
María Lopéz (GK)
Esther Termens
Gloria Comerma
Georgina Oliva
Marta Fabregas
Yurena Panadero

Coach: Svitlana Makayeva

Tetiana Stepanchenko (GK)
Yevheniya Moroz
Olga Gulenko
Olena Fritche
Olena Ivakhnenko
Tetyana Kobzenko (C)
Maryna Khilko
Nataliya Vasyukova
Maryna Vynohradova
Yana Vorushylo
Halyna Hlynenko
Tetyana Salenko
Bohdana Sadova
Alvina Budonna (GK)
Diana Tahiyeva
Juliia Nonko
Olena Derkach
Yana Sitalo

Qualifying 2

Coach: Michel van den Boer

Nadine Khouzam (GK)
Caroline Guisset
Margaux Grossen
Astrid Vervaet
Morgane Vouche
Olivia Bouche
Valerie Vermeersch
Valerie Herbert
Lola Danhaive
An Christiaens (C)
Gaelle Valcke
Louise Cavenaile
Charlotte De Vos
Carole Dembour
Anne-Sophie Van Regemortel
Elizabeth Achten (GK)
Valentine Van Vyve  
Sofie Gierts.

Coach: Steve Colledge

Salomé Dain
Géraldine Bonenfant
Marie-Céline Lamas
Juliette Heven
Emilie Begue
Fanny Verrier
Claire Sansonetti
Charlotte Boyer
Perrine Roger
Philippine Berly
Gwenaelle Dutel
Margaux de Galzain
Athena Richard
Sunita D'Hallain
Justine Duby
Elise Preney
Anabelle Got (GK)
Marion Rheby (GK, C)

Coach: Maharaj Krishan Kaushik

Marita Tirkey (GK)
Binita Toppo
Suman Bala
Rajwinder Kaur
Asunta Lakra
Rosalind Ralte
Surinder Kaur
Mamta Kharab (C)
Dipika Murthy (GK)
Rita Rani
[[Gagandeep Kaur]]
[[Jasjeet Kaur Handa]]
<li value=24>[[Saba Anjum Karim]]
<li value=26>[[Deepika Thakur]]
[[Ranjita Devi Thockchom]]
[[Rani Devi]]
[[Pritam Rani Siwach]]
[[Subhadra Pradhan]]
{{div col end}}

{{fhw|Netherlands Antilles}}
Coach: [[Bas Swildens]]
{{div col|colwidth=22em}}
[[Marlieke van de Pas]] (GK)
[[Sanne Pouwels]] (GK)
[[Marlies van der Stel]]
[[Theresia Noorlander]]
[[Jolanda Clemens]]
[[Anika de Haas]]
[[Ernestina Schreuder]] (C)
[[Charlotte Heuvelings]]
[[Anne-Maaike Elsen]]
<li value=11>[[Sanne van Donk]]
[[Juliette Plantenga]]
[[Claire Visser]]
[[Pauline Roels]]
[[Maria Hinskens]]
[[Paulien Eigenhuis]]
[[Bernadette Wesdorp]]
[[Floortje Joosten]]
[[Kim de Haas]]
{{div col end}}

{{fhw|Russia}}
Coach: [[Valentina Apelganets]]
{{div col|colwidth=22em}}
[[Galina Terenteva]] (GK)
[[Elvira Komissarova]]
[[Ekaterina Cherkasova]]
[[Svetlana Nikonova]]
[[Svetlana Grigorieva]]
[[Tatiana Lastochkina]]
[[Maria Nikitina]]
[[Elena Svirskaya]] (C)
[[Anna Guteneva]]
<li value=11>[[Olga Shentsova]]
[[Irina Ospitova]]
<li value=15>[[Marina Dudko]]
[[Margarita Drepenkina]]
[[Irina Kuzmina]]
[[Anna Matersheva]]
[[Oxana Serezhkina]] (GK)
[[Kristina Mozgovaya]]
[[Daria Vasileva]]
{{div col end}}

{{fhw|United States}}
Coach: [[Lee Bodimeade]]
{{div col|colwidth=22em}}
<li value=2>[[Melissa Leonetti]]
[[Angela Loy]]
[[Kelly Doton]]
<li value=7>[[Jesse Gey]]
[[Rachel Dawson]]
<li value=10>[[Tiffany Snow]]
<li value=13>[[Keli Smith]]
<li value=15>[[Dana Sensenig]]
[[Barbara Weinberg]] (GK)
<li value=17>[[Carrie Lingo]]
<li value=19>[[Caroline Nichols]]
<li value=22>[[Kate Barber]] (C)
[[Katelyn Falgowski]]
[[Dina Rizzo]]
[[Amy Tran]] (GK)
[[Kayla Bashore]]
[[Lauren Crandall]]
[[Lauren Powle]]
{{div col end}}

Qualifying 3

{{fhw|Canada}}
Coach: [[Sally Bell]]
{{div col|colwidth=22em}}
[[Cailie O'Hara]]
<li value=3>[[Megan Anderson (field hockey)|Megan Anderson]]
<li value=4>[[Carly Dickson]]
<li value=6>[[Philippa Kedgley]]
<li value=8>[[Stephanie Jameson]]
[[Katie Rushton]]
[[Christine DePape]]
[[Sarah Forbes (field hockey)|Sarah Forbes]] (GK)
<li value=13>[[Stephanie Hume]] (C)
<li value=14>[[Katie Baker]]
[[Hilary Linton]]
<li value=17>[[Marian Dickinson]]
[[Kim Buker]]
[[Andrea Rushton]]
[[Kathryn Gillis]]
<li value=22>[[Tiffany Michaluk]]
<li value=27>[[Clare Linton]]
<li value=32>[[Azelia Liu]]
{{div col end}}

{{fhw|Ireland}}
Coach: [[Gene Muller]]
{{div col|colwidth=22em}}
[[Mary Goode]] (GK)
[[Louisa Healy]] (GK)
<li value=5>[[Cliodhna Sargent]]
[[Eimear Cregan]] (C)
[[Emma Clarke (field hockey)|Emma Clarke]]
[[Emma Stewart (field hockey)|Emma Stewart]]
[[Bridget McKeever]]
[[Shirley McCay]]
[[Jenny McDonough]]
<li value=12>[[Cathy McKean]]
[[Alex Speers]]
[[Julia O'Halloran]]
[[Ciara O'Brien]]
[[Louisa Moore]]
[[Nikki Symmons]]
<li value=19>[[Hollie Moffett]]
<li value=22>[[Lisa Jacob (field hockey)|Lisa Jacob]]
<li value=26>[[Clare Perkhill]]
{{div col end}}

{{fhw|Italy}}
Coach: [[Fernando Ferrara]]
{{div col|colwidth=22em}}
[[Roberta Lilliu]] (GK)
[[Stella Girotti]] (C)
[[Romina Dinucci]]
[[Simona Berrino]]
[[Carolina Scandroli]]
[[Paola Lombardi]]
[[Francesca Zucca]]
[[Maria Victoria Corso]]
[[Francesca Faustini]]
<li value=10>[[Daniela Possali]]
[[Jasbeer Singh]]
[[Paula Calvo]] (GK)
[[Francesca Zamboni]]
[[Alejandra Blanco]]
[[Julieta Obrist]]
[[Matilde Canavosio]]
[[Chiara Tiddi]]
<li value=21>[[Valentina Quaranta]]
{{div col end}}

{{fhw|South Korea}}
Coach: [[Han Jin-Soo]]
{{div col|colwidth=22em}}
[[Lim Ju-Young]] (C, GK)
<li value=3>[[Cho Hye-Sook]]
<li value=7>[[Lee Seon-Ok]]
[[Kim Jung-Hee]]
[[Park Mi-Hyun]]
[[Kim Jin-Kyoung]]
[[Kim Mi-Seon]]
[[Kim Jong-Eun]]
<li value=14>[[Eom Mi-Young]]
<li value=15>[[Gim Sung-Hee]]
[[Moon Young-Hui]] (GK)
[[Lim Seon-Mee]]
[[Park Jeong-Sook]]
[[Kim Eun-Siil]]
<li value=21>[[Seo Hye-Jin]]
[[Kim Da-Rae]]
[[Lee Young-Sil]]
<li value=27>[[Cheon Seul-Ki]]
{{div col end}}

{{fhw|Malaysia}}
Coach: [[Yahya Atan]]
{{div col|colwidth=22em}}
[[Farah Ayuni Yahya]] (GK)
[[Rosmah Asrin]]
[[Intan Nurairah Ahmad Khushaini]]
[[Sebah Kari]]
[[Noor Hasliza Md Ali]]
<li value=8>[[Juliani Mohamad Din]]
[[Norfaraha Hashim]] (C)
<li value=11>[[Nurul Nadia Md Mokhtar]]
[[Chitra Devi Arumugam]]
<li value=13>[[Kannagi Arumugam]]
[[Nadia Abdul Rahman]]
[[Norbaini Hashim]]
<li value=17>[[Siti Rahmah Othman]]
[[Siti Sarah Nurfarahah Ismail]]
[[Fazilla Sylvester Silin]]
<li value=21>[[Nuraini Abdul Rashid]]
<li value=25>[[Marlia Mohamed]]
[[Ernawati Mahmud]] (GK)
{{div col end}}

{{fhw|Uruguay}}
Coach: [[Diana Pazos]]
{{div col|colwidth=22em}}
[[Paula Perez]]
[[Maite de Maria]]
[[Florencia Curutchague]]
[[Alessandra Raso]]
[[Agustina Neito]]
[[Victoria Bassainzteguy]]
[[Teresa Algorta]]
[[Cardina Gibernau]]
[[Virginia Bessio]]
<li value=10>[[Magdalena Cristiani]]
[[Sofia Sanguinetti]]
[[Noel de los Santos]]
[[Mercedes Coates]]
[[Sofia Mora]]
[[Virginia Casabo]]
[[Jose Fernandez (field hockey)|Jose Fernandez]]
[[Marsha Stanley]]
{{div col end}}

External links
[http://www.olympicqualifierwomenazerbaijan.sportcentric.com/ Official website (Qualifying 1)]
[http://www.olympicqualifierwomenrussia.sportcentric.com/ Official website (Qualifying 2)]
[http://www.olympicqualifierwomencanada.sportcentric.com/ Official website (Qualifying 3)]

[[Category:Field hockey at the 2008 Summer Olympics – Women's tournament|Qual]]
[[Category:Women's Olympic field hockey squads]]